Cochylimorpha hilarana is a species of moth of the family Tortricidae. It is found in most of Europe and Asia Minor.
The wingspan is 17–23 mm. Adults have been recorded from wing from July to August.

The larvae feed on Artemisia campestris and possibly Artemisia maritima. The feeding causes a swelling of the basal part of a young stem of the host plant. The gall may be partly hidden in the soil. The larvae are whitish with a light brown or dark brown head. They can be found in June and July.

References

 

H
Moths of Asia
Moths of Europe
Moths described in 1851